This is a list of Malaysian films produced and released in 2013. Most of the film are produced in the Malay language, but there also a significant number of films that are produced in English, Mandarin, Cantonese, Hokkien and Tamil.

2013

Movie List

References

External links
Malaysian film at the Internet Movie Database
Malaysian Feature Films Finas
Cinema Online Malaysia

Malaysia
2013
2013 in Malaysia